Blairgowrie RFC is a rugby union club based in Blairgowrie and Rattray, Scotland.

History

It was founded in 1980, originally as Blairgowrie HSFP.

There was a previous Blairgowrie rugby side in the 19th century which often provided players to the Perthshire county side to play Fifeshire. For example, P. D. Laing at full back and W. Robertson at quarter (Centre) in 1889.

The John Johnston Coupar Park which the club plays on was the land an old berry farm used to reside. The land was bequeathed to the town for recreational use when the berry farming on the site ended.

The side recorded a 172 - nil victory in a friendly match against Howe of Fife in the early season of 2016–17. That was a portent of things to come as the team won the Bowl Final at Murrayfield at the end of that season.

The club hit the headlines in June 2021 when one of the players went into cardiac arrest - he was saved by his teammates using CPR and then a defibrillator. The club president Mark Reddin explained:
We’ve got a couple of guys who are police officers at the club, and two of them knew what to do straight away and started giving CPR. Everybody there jumped into action and did exactly what they're supposed to do. Hamish is a young guy, 20, about to turn 21, and I'm delighted that he has survived this. We were just playing a touch game that we do during the summer months. It was about 7pm and Hamish fell to the ground, I think he was holding his head and he started fitting, it was clear that it was a big issue. He couldn't breathe and his lips were turning blue. Hamish actually had his heart stop, it was the defibrillator that brought him back. It's worth its weight in gold, I think what this shows is the importance of these machines, the fact that having it there can even save one life.

Former Scotland internationals Sean Lamont and Rory Lamont's mother was a previous Secretary of the club; however her sons did not play for the club.

Sides

Blairgowrie runs various sides including men's, women's and juniors. The Blairgowrie Rams are its junior club. The rams are run for boys and girls aged 5–17.

Blairgowrie Tens

Blairgowrie host an annual rugby tens tournament; which usually takes place alongside the Blairgowrie Ale Festival.

Honours

 Regional Bowl
 Champions (1): 2016-17

References

Rugby union in Perth and Kinross
Scottish rugby union teams